Lungulețu is a commune in Dâmbovița County, Muntenia, Romania with a population of 5,669 people. It is composed of three villages: Lungulețu, Oreasca and Serdanu.

References

Communes in Dâmbovița County
Localities in Muntenia